The 2011 Nigerian Senate election in Adamawa State was held on April 9, 2011, to elect members of the Nigerian Senate to represent Adamawa State. Bindo Jibrilla representing Adamawa North, Ahmed Hassan Barata representing Adamawa South and Bello Muhammed Tukur representing Adamawa Central all won on the platform of People's Democratic Party.

Overview

Summary

Adamawa North 
People's Democratic Party candidate Bindo Jibrilla won the election, defeating Action Congress candidate Haruna Boni and other party candidates.

Adamawa South 
People's Democratic Party candidate Ahmed Hassan Barata won the election, defeating Action Congress candidate Jada Koiriga Mohammed and other party candidates.

Adamawa Central 
People's Democratic Party candidate Bello Muhammed Tukur won the election, defeating Labour Party candidate Dahiru Bobbo and other party candidates.

References 

April 2011 events in Nigeria
Adam
Adamawa State Senate elections